Baralku is the fifth studio album by American DJ Emancipator. It is named after Baralku island upon which the dead are believed to live in Indigenous Australian Yolngu culture. It was released on November 17, 2017.

Track listing

References

2017 albums
Emancipator (musician) albums